Fanny Lucille Ketter (born 22 January 1996 in Lilla Uppåkra, Sweden)  is a Swedish actress. She is daughter to visual artist and musician Clay Ketter and Jenny Mark Ketter, communications officer at IM, a Swedish N.G.O.

Fanny started samhällsvetenskapsprogrammet in August 2012 at S:t Petriskolan in Malmö.

In 2013 she got a stipendium from the United World Colleges and she is now studying at Red Cross Nordic in Norway.

She started her career by playing Billie in the Swedish TV-series Vid Vintergatans slut. She was the only human that was filmed in front of a greenscreen, because the space suit she was wearing was blue.

Filmography

Film 
 2012 – Bitch Hug
 2013 – Reel
 2014 – Her er Harold
 2014 – Hot Nasty Teen
 2015 – Eternal Summer

Television 
 2010 – Vid Vintergatans slut
 2010–2011 Gabba Gabba
 2011 – The Bridge

References

Notes

External links 

 

1996 births
Living people